George Stacey may refer to:
 George Stacey (footballer)
 George Stacey (abolitionist)

See also
 George Stacy, a fictional character appearing in Marvel Comics comic books